Hyder can refer to:

Places
Hyder, Alaska, U.S.
Hyder Seaplane Base
Hyder, Arizona, U.S.
Hyder Valley
Hyder Creek, is a river in New York, U.S.

Other uses
Hyder (defunct company), a former Welsh utility company
Hyder Consulting, a subsidiary company, an advisory and design consultancy
Hyder (name)

See also

Ghulam Hyder Siyal, village in Sindh, Pakistan
Hyderabad